Lavers' Crossing is a former settlement in Kern County, California.

The town was founded by David Lavers, who settled there in 1858. For the following decade, Lavers' Crossing was the trading center for the surrounding Linn's valley before being supplanted in that role by Glennville. The site is now registered as California Historical Landmark #672. Mr. Myers built at store here in 1859 and later moved it to Glennville.

The California Historical Landmark number 672 reads: 
NO. 672 LAVERS CROSSING - In 1854, John C. Reid filed a squatter's claim on this spot - the same year Kern County's first school class was held here. In 1859, David Lavers, with his father and brother, John, built a hotel and stage barn on the old Bull Road. The crossing was the principal community in Linn's Valley until about 1870. Date of marker registration February 16, 1959.

See also
 California Historical Landmarks in Kern County
California Historical Landmark

References

Former settlements in Kern County, California
California Historical Landmarks
Greenhorn Mountains
Former populated places in California
Populated places established in 1858
1858 establishments in California